Leobardo Perez Jimenez (born September 22, 1945) is a Colombian abstract and figurative artist. He is a painter and sculptor.

Gallery

References

External links
 Exposition Bibliothèque Publique Pilote
 Ministère de la culture de la Colombie
 
  et 
 Programme de protection aux victimes
 Exposition BPP
 Breve biographie de l'artiste.

1945 births
Colombian painters
Colombian male painters
Colombian sculptors
Living people
Modern painters
Modern sculptors
20th-century sculptors